Museo delle genti d'Abruzzo (Italian for Museum of the people of Abruzzo)  is an ethnographic Museum in Pescara, Abruzzo.

History

Collection

Notes

External links

Pescara
Museums in Abruzzo
Ethnographic museums in Italy